Substituted arylalkylamines are a group of chemical compounds. Two major classes of arylalkylamines include indolylalkylamines (e.g., tryptamines [a.k.a. indolylethylamines]) and phenylalkylamines (e.g., phenethylamines and amphetamines [a.k.a. phenylisopropylamines]), which consist of the monoamine neurotransmitters as well as clinically-used and recreationally-abused monoaminergic drugs, including psychostimulants,  anorectics, wakefulness-promoting agents, bronchodilators, decongestants, antidepressants, entactogens, and psychedelics, among others.

See also
 Amine
 Alkylamine
 Arylamine

References

Amines